The National Council of YMCAs of India is a part of the global YMCA fraternity which is known as World Alliance of YMCAs. It was formed in Madras on February 21, 1891 through the initiative of David McConaughy. The headquarters shifted to Calcutta in May, 1902. In 1964 it shifted to New Delhi, its present location.

References

External links
 Official website

Organizations established in 1891
YMCA
Youth organisations based in India
1891 establishments in India
Affiliated institutions of the National Council of Churches in India